Delta Yokuts also termed Far Northern Valley Yokuts is an extinct dialect network of Valley Yokuts, an indigenous Yokutsan language of California. Delta Yokuts dialects were spoken from directly northeast of modern Stockton to the confluence of the Merced and San Joaquin rivers near modern Hills Ferry.

Among the attested and named dialects of Delta Yokuts were Yachikumne (Chulamni), Pasasamne,  Tamukamne (also known as Tamcan),  Cholovomne, Lakisamne, Atsnil, Coconoon (also spelled Huocon and Cucunun).

References 

Yokutsan languages